In music, Op. 26 stands for Opus number 26. Compositions that are assigned this number include:

 Barber – Piano Sonata
 Beethoven – Piano Sonata No. 12
 Brahms – Piano Quartet No. 2
 Bruch – Violin Concerto No. 1
 Chopin – Polonaises, Op. 26
 Dvořák – Piano Trio No. 2
 Enescu – Cello Sonata No. 2
 Ernst – Grand Caprice on "Erlkönig"
 Goldmark – Rustic Wedding Symphony
 Kabalevsky – The Comedians
 Mendelssohn – The Hebrides
 Myaskovsky – Symphony No. 8
 Oswald – Piano Quartet No. 2
 Prokofiev – Piano Concerto No. 3
 Sarasate – Spanish Dances, Book IV
 Schoenberg – Wind Quintet
 Schumann – Faschingsschwank aus Wien
 Scriabin – Symphony No. 1
 Sibelius – Finlandia
 Spohr – Clarinet Concerto No. 1
 Tchaikovsky – Sérénade mélancolique
 Waterhouse – Piccolo Quintet
 Weber – Concertino for Clarinet